Oscar Lawton Wilkerson (February 9, 1926 – February 8, 2023) was an American pilot and radio personality. He was one of the Tuskegee Airmen, a group of African American aviators and support personnel who served during World War II.

Early life 
Wilkerson was born February 9, 1926, in Chicago Heights, Illinois. He graduated from Bloom Township High School in 1944 and joined the United States Air Force.

Military career 
Wilkerson moved to Tuskegee, Alabama, for training and was assigned to the 617th Bombardment Squadron. He became 2nd Lieutenant and earned his "wings" in 1946. Wilkerson completed his training after the end of the war, so he did not have the chance to fly in combat.

Wilkerson faced significant racial discrimination while serving in the Air Force because of the segregation of the military at the time. “The military had no intention of using black pilots. The real mission, the underlying mission, was for us to fail and prove their point,” Wilkerson said in an interview with the Southtown Star. Wilkerson faced segregation when he was required to sit in a different train car than white soldiers on his way to the Tuskegee base. When he arrived there, he found that blacks were forced to eat separately during meals and to sit apart from white soldiers while watching films. Along with the other Tuskegee Airmen, Wilkerson proved that blacks could perform military duties as capably as whites could. The Tuskegee Airmen had a direct impact on the integration of the armed services.

Civilian career 
Following his military service, Wilkerson attended New York University to study photography. He also attended the Midwest Broadcasting School and graduated in 1960. He worked as a DJ for WBEE-AM in Harvey, Illinois and was known as "Weekend Wilkie." He also hosted his own radio show, Wilk's World. He served as community relations director and later as program director for WBEE-AM. Later, he worked for the radio station WMAQ (AM) until his retirement. Since his retirement, Wilkerson has spent time volunteering for the Chicago "DODO" Chapter of the Tuskegee Airmen, helping minority and at-risk youth fly for free through the "Young Eagles" program.

Personal life and death 
Wilkerson lived in Markham, Illinois. He died on February 8, 2023, a day before his 97th birthday.

Awards
 Congressional Gold Medal awarded to the Tuskegee Airmen in 2006

See also
 Dogfights (TV series)
 Executive Order 9981
 List of Tuskegee Airmen
 Military history of African Americans
 The Tuskegee Airmen (movie)

Related works 

History Makers Interview with Wilkerson
Red Tails, a 2012 film about the Tuskegee Airmen

References

External links

1926 births
2023 deaths
Tuskegee Airmen
People from Chicago Heights, Illinois
Aviators from Illinois
African-American DJs
Philanthropists from Illinois
United States Army Air Forces pilots of World War II
New York University alumni
21st-century African-American people
Military personnel from Illinois